The 2013–14 Quinnipiac Bobcats men's basketball team represented Quinnipiac University during the 2013–14 NCAA Division I men's basketball season. The Bobcats, led by seventh year head coach Tom Moore, played their home games at the TD Bank Sports Center and were first year members of the Metro Atlantic Athletic Conference. They finished the season 20–12, 14–6 in MAAC play to finish in a tie for third place. They advanced to the semifinals of the MAAC tournament where they lost to Manhattan. They were invited to the collegeInsider.com Tournament where they lost in the first round to Yale.

Roster

Schedule

|-
!colspan=9 style="background:#003664; color:#C2980B;"| Regular season

|-
!colspan=9 style="background:#003664; color:#C2980B;"| MAAC tournament

|-
!colspan=9 style="background:#003664; color:#C2980B;"| CIT

References

Quinnipiac Bobcats men's basketball seasons
Quinnipiac
Quinnipiac
Quinnipiac Bobcats
Quinnipiac Bobcats